Sainte-Anne or Sainte-Anne-d'Auray or Sainte-Anne-en-Pluneret is a railway station in Pluneret, Brittany, France. The station was opened on 26 September 1862, and is located on the Savenay–Landerneau railway. The station is served by regional trains to Quimper, Lorient and Vannes.

Gallery

References

TER Bretagne
Railway stations in France opened in 1862
Railway stations in Morbihan